Riebeeckosaurus is an extinct genus of tapinocephalian therapsids from the Guadalupian epoch of  Middle Tapinocephalus Zone, lower Beaufort Beds of the Karoo, in South Africa. Only two skulls are known from the type genus.

It was a herbivorous, medium-sized ( in length,  in mass) dinocephalian, with a very long, slender snout and a narrow intertemporal region with a narrow sagittal crest.

See also
 List of therapsids

References

 The main groups of non-mammalian synapsids at Mikko's Phylogeny Archive

External links 
 Tapinocephalidae at Kheper

Tapinocephalians
Prehistoric therapsid genera
Guadalupian synapsids of Africa
Fossil taxa described in 1952
Taxa named by Lieuwe Dirk Boonstra